The Image Has Cracked is the debut studio album by English band Alternative TV. It was released in May 1978 by record label Deptford Fun City.

Recording and content 

The album's studio tracks were recorded at Surrey Sound Studios in Leatherhead, Surrey, and the album's live tracks were recorded live at the 100 Club in London on 7 February 1978.

Jools Holland plays synthesiser and piano on two tracks on the album.

Reception 

Trouser Press wrote: "Although the abstract stuff doesn't hold up so well, it's still an amazing document of a time and place." In his retrospective review, Ned Raggett of AllMusic called the album "an unfairly neglected classic from the late-'70s upheaval. Seizing on the promise of punk as being a new means of expression rather than a new set of musical rules to be adhered to, Perry, along with a solid-enough band, whip up a series of incendiary pieces that explore as much as they thrash [...] As an expression of going down defiant while punk became a new fashion, it's fierce and brilliant."

Track listing

Personnel 
 Alternative TV

 Mark Perry – vocals, guitar, production
 Dennis Burns – bass guitar, production
 Chris Bennett – drums, percussion, production

 Additional personnel

 Jools Holland – Moog synthesizer on "Alternatives", piano on "Viva La Rock 'n' Roll"
 Kim Turner – "special assistance" rhythm guitar, piano

 Technical

 Chris Gray – engineering, production
 Nigel Gray – engineering
 Steve Angel – mastering
 Jill Furmanovsky – cover design
 Harry T. Murlowski – sleeve photography
 Tony Stubbs – sleeve design (soapbox)

References

Further reading

External links 

 

1978 debut albums
Punk rock albums by British artists
Alternative TV albums